Pierre Sanoussi-Bliss (born 17 August 1962, Berlin-Mitte) is a German actor and director. He has appeared in television and films for over 20 years. He played a leading role in Doris Dörrie's 1994 film, . He also plays a leading role in the comedy series Alles wird gut.

His most famous role is likely that of Axel Richter in the detective series The Old Fox from 1997. He has also directed Zurück auf Los (2000), for which he was nominated for an award in the International Filmfest Emden. The film premiered at the 2000 Berlin International Film Festival, was shown at over 60 international film festivals and is available on DVD. Sanoussi-Bliss made a famous speech as the only representative of the media at the 2006 international summit at the German Chancellery.

Sanoussi-Bliss has done voice work in audiobooks, such as Salve Roma! by Akif Pirinçci and Was machen wir jetzt? by Doris Dörrie. He works as an honorary ambassador at the Children's Hospice in Mitteldeutschland Nordhausen in Tambach-Dietharz.

Personal life
Sanoussi-Bliss was educated in the Ernst Busch Academy of Dramatic Arts (Hochschule für Schauspielkunst "Ernst Busch"). His life partner since 2002, Till Kaposty-Bliss, is a graphic designer. The couple lives in Berlin. He is of Guinean descent.

Nominations
Emden Film Award (2000)

Selected filmography
 1989: Verflixtes Mißgeschick!
 1989: Coming Out 
 1993: Zirri - Das Wolkenschaf
 1994: 
 1996: The Superwife 
 1998: Am I Beautiful?
 2000: Zurück auf Los!- Sam 
 2002: Angst isst Seele auf
 2010: The Hairdresser

Bibliography
 Sanoussi-Bliss, Pierre and Paul Gilling: Der Nix. Kato Kunst und Verlag (2006);

References

External links
 
 Pierre Sanoussi-Bliss, ZDF.de; accessed 12 August 2015. 
 Literature about and by Pierre Sanoussi-Bliss, portal.d-nb.de (German National Library); accessed 12 August 2015. 
 Profile, agentur-kling.de; accessed 12 August 2015.

1962 births
Living people
Male actors from Berlin
German male film actors
German male television actors
German people of Guinean descent
German gay actors